Andrew Myers (born 19 December 1968) is a Jamaican former cyclist. He competed in two events at the 1992 Summer Olympics.

References

External links
 

1968 births
Living people
Jamaican male cyclists
Olympic cyclists of Jamaica
Cyclists at the 1992 Summer Olympics
Place of birth missing (living people)